The 359th Infantry Division was a German infantry division in World War II. It was formed on 11 November 1943 in Radom and surrendered to Soviet forces near Braunau, present-day Broumov in the Czech Republic.

Commanding officers
Generalleutnant Karl Arndt, 20 November 1943 – 25 April 1945

References
 Tessin, Georg (1974). Verbände und Truppen der deutschen Wehrmacht und Waffen-SS im Zweiten Weltkrieg 1939–1945. Neunter Band. Die Landstreitkräfte 281–370. Biblio-Verlag, Osnabrück. .

Infantry divisions of Germany during World War II